Raúl Rafael Carlos Juliá y Arcelay (March 9, 1940 – October 24, 1994) was a Puerto Rican actor. Born in San Juan, he took an interest in acting while still in school and pursued the career upon completion of his studies. After performing locally for some time, he was convinced by actor and entertainment personality Orson Bean to move and work in New York City. Juliá, who had been bilingual since his childhood, soon gained interest in Broadway and Off-Broadway plays. He took over the role of Orson in the Off-Broadway hit Your Own Thing, a rock musical update of Twelfth Night. He performed in mobile projects, including the Puerto Rican Traveling Theater.

Juliá was eventually noticed by producer Joseph Papp, who offered him work in the New York Shakespeare Festival. After gaining visibility, he received roles in two television series, Love of Life and Sesame Street. In 1978, he famously starred alongside Meryl Streep in an electric revival of Shakespeare's Taming of the Shrew at the Delacorte Theater. In 1979, Juliá starred in the original Broadway production of Harold Pinter's Betrayal alongside Roy Scheider and Blythe Danner. For his performance in Two Gentlemen of Verona, he received a nomination for the Tony Award and won a Drama Desk Award. Between 1974 and 1982, Juliá received Tony Award for Best Actor in a Musical nominations for Where's Charley?, The Threepenny Opera and Nine. In 1991, Juliá acted alongside Christopher Walken in a revival of Othello and in 1984, he starred in Design for Living with Frank Langella and Jill Clayburgh.

He is also known for his performances in films; his film debut came in 1971 acting alongside Al Pacino in The Panic in Needle Park. During the 1980s, he worked in several films; he received two nominations for the Golden Globe Awards, for his performances in Tempest and Kiss of the Spider Woman; he won the National Board of Review Award for Best Actor for the latter. He also appeared in Francis Ford Coppola's One from the Heart (1982), Sidney Lumet's The Morning After (1986), Romero (1989) and Clint Eastwood's The Rookie (1990). In 1991 and 1993, Julia portrayed Gomez Addams in two film adaptations of The Addams Family. In 1994, he filmed The Burning Season and a film adaptation of the Street Fighter video games. The same year, Juliá suffered several health afflictions, eventually dying after suffering a stroke. His funeral was held in Puerto Rico, attended by thousands. For his work in The Burning Season, Juliá won a posthumous Golden Globe Award, Primetime Emmy Award, and Screen Actors Guild Award.

In 2017, The Daily Telegraph named him one of the best actors never to have received an Academy Award nomination.

Early life and education
Juliá was born March 9, 1940, in Floral Park (Hato Rey), a suburb of San Juan, to Olga Arcelay and Raúl Juliá. He was the oldest of four brothers, and sisters Maria Eugenia Juliá and Olga Maria Juliá. His mother was a mezzo-soprano who sang in a church choir before marrying Juliá's father, who was an electrical engineer graduated from Trine University. 
Juliá's brother, Rafa, died in a car accident when Juliá was 19 years old. Some relatives were also musicians, including his great aunt María González, whom he credited as the inspiration behind his artistic career. The family was Catholic.

Raúl's father was the founder of La Cueva del Chicken Inn, a restaurant in San Juan. The building was originally a gas station and body shop before being remodeled after a similar restaurant in Madrid, Spain, called Las Cuevas de Luis Candelas, which is intended to mimic the structure of a gypsum cave. Juliá's father claimed that he brought pizza to Puerto Rico, after he hired an Italian cook in New York City who could prepare pizza. The restaurant is also supposed to be the first to distribute chicken-in-a-basket within the archipelago, which Miriam Fitts helped him think of.

Juliá was enrolled in the Colegio Espíritu Santo in Hato Rey, a Catholic private school, where most of the personnel spoke exclusively English. There, he participated in his first play in first grade, interpreting the devil, with his performance earning him participation in all subsequent school plays. After witnessing Errol Flynn's performance in The Adventures of Robin Hood, he decided to pursue an acting career.

During his childhood, Juliá's family followed a strict Jesuit practice, often taking homeless children into their household. His mother received recognition from the Catholic University of Ponce for these efforts.

By the seventh grade, Juliá was able to speak English fluently and had gained interest in the works of William Shakespeare. Juliá concluded his secondary education at Colegio San Ignacio de Loyola, where he would organize plays of Julius Caesar, Hamlet, King Lear, and The Tempest. Seeking to please his parents, he continued his education with a year at Fordham University, the well known private Jesuit university in New York City, before returning home to enroll at the University of Puerto Rico, where he joined the Phi Sigma Alpha fraternity.

Juliá continued acting in local plays and nightclubs as he earned a Bachelor of Arts degree. Juliá eventually realized that he had no interest in pursuing the law career favored by his parents, choosing to act full-time despite having doubts that he could sustain himself working as an actor.

Acting career

New York Shakespeare Festival
Consequently, Juliá began performing in several plays that were held in San Juan. He performed in a re-staging of Macbeth, which was held in one of the municipality's colonial castles in order to simulate the setting of the work. Other works included playing the role of Roderigo in Othello at a local drama production. Parallel to this, Juliá began making presentations at the Ted Mack Amateur Hour. After joining a musical group named the Lamplighters, despite receiving opposition from his parents, he was recruited by Lillian Hurst to perform alongside her, eventually receiving work at a hotel named El Convento.

During this time, he began considering the possibility of moving to Europe to take acting classes. During one of their acts, Juliá was approached by Orson Bean, who was on vacation in Puerto Rico and provided him with contact information, wanting him to travel to New York and work there. His parents were shocked by the proposal, but ultimately agreed to support his decision. Juliá's departure was postponed after his younger brother, Rafael, died in a traffic collision. During this time, he became engaged to Magda Vasallo Molinelli.

In 1964, when he was 24 years old, he traveled to New York, arriving in the middle of a winter storm. After establishing residence in Manhattan, Juliá worked at a variety of odd jobs to pay his expenses, going so far as to attend sales training (provided by a distributor) in the proper way to sell pens. When Hurst visited him, they attended a Broadway play, which prompted a discovery that surprised him—that it was possible to work as an actor full-time. As a result, Juliá began seeking employment in both Broadway and Off-Broadway plays. Seeking to further improve his acting, he took lessons from Wynn Handman, who was recommended by Bean; his class included future fellow star Christopher Walken.

His first work was in a production of Pedro Calderón de la Barca's Life Is a Dream, where he played Astolfo, thereby making himself eligible to receive his Actors Equity card from Actors' Equity Association. Initially, Juliá received an allowance from his parents, but after hiring manager Jeff Hunter, he landed a role in a production of Bye Bye Birdie, thereafter declining further financial assistance. He began performing with Phoebe Brand's mobile theatre, presenting plays in low-income neighborhoods of New York. In 1965, he married Vasallo Molinelli.

In 1966, Juliá was cast in the role of Macduff in a Spanish-language version of Macbeth, and also performed in The Ox Cart (La Carreta), a stage play written by Puerto Rican playwright René Marqués. Miriam Colón Valle, who also participated in La Carreta, established the Puerto Rican Traveling Theater, where he performed. In 1967, the founder of the New York Shakespeare Festival (NYSF), Joseph Papp, attended a performance at Delacorte Theater, where Juliá was reading patriotic Puerto Rican poetry. Subsequently, Papp offered him the role of Demetrius in a staging of Titus Andronicus. After this play concluded, he contacted Papp who offered him the job of stage manager in NYSF's Hamlet. While performing this task, Juliá also performed in some of the plays.

Broadway and television

In September 1968, after auditioning four times for the role, Juliá debuted in his first Broadway play, performing as Chan in a staging of The Cuban Thing. The following year, he was cast in a production of Arthur Kopit's Indians. During this timeframe, he and Vasallo Molinelli were divorced. In 1970, Juliá, in the role of Paco Montoya in The Castro Complex, received notably favorable reviews. While rehearsing for an Off-Broadway play, he met Merel Poloway and began a relationship with her.

As he gained prominence on Broadway, Juliá was cast in two television series, Love of Life and Sesame Street. He disliked his role in Love of Life, only appearing on the show for a brief time. On Sesame Street, he was Rafael the Fix-It Man, a recurring character during the show's third season. Raphael the Fix-It Man’s partner at the Fix-It Shop was Emilio Delgado's character Luis, who, after debuting with Juliá, went on to a long tenure on the show. During 1971–1972, Juliá earned roles in three films: The Organization, The Panic in Needle Park, and a film adaptation of Been Down So Long It Looks Like Up to Me.

While working on Sesame Street, Julia was contacted by Papp, who offered him the role of Proteus in Two Gentlemen of Verona. For his performance in this play, Juliá received his first nomination for a Tony Award and won the 1972 Drama Desk Award for Outstanding Performance. In 1973, he interpreted Edmund in King Lear, followed by the role of Orlando in As You Like It. Juliá noted that he cherished the roles he played in these Shakespeare plays, particularly the rhythm, music, and poetry present in them. He also acted in Via Galacticas limited presentation on Broadway and, on television, played Dr. Greg Robinson, Jerry's brother, in the "Oh, Brother" episode of The Bob Newhart Show.

In 1974, Juliá was cast as the titular role of Charley Wykeham in the comedy, Where's Charley?, receiving his second Tony Award nomination for his performance. He subsequently joined Werner Erhard's Erhard Seminars Training or "est", an organization that promotes self-motivation, by participating in its seminars. In 1976, Juliá played Mack the Knife in The Threepenny Opera, interpreting the dialogue with a marked British accent. The performance earned him a third Tony Award nomination. He then returned to film as Italian car racer Franco Bertollini in The Gumball Rally.

That same year, Juliá married Poloway in the Catskill Mountains. The ceremony was led by Swami Muktananda as part of a spiritual retreat. The couple had met the Swami through Erhard. After this retreat, Erhard founded The Hunger Project, claiming that after traveling to India, he felt motivated to found a non-profit organization to eliminate world hunger through philanthropic galas. Juliá joined the initiative at its conception, establishing a personal goal of raising one million dollars for the organization. In 1978, his interpretation of the lead role in the 1924 theatrical version of  Dracula was well received.

While performing as Dracula, Juliá also played Petruchio in The Taming of the Shrew. His interaction with co-star Meryl Streep was tense at first, before developing into a friendship as the production advanced. Juliá followed up his double-duty stage work with a role in a film adaptation of The Tempest, spending several months in Italy while exploring its culture. During this time, he received the script for Nine, the play which would garner him a fourth Tony Award nomination. In preparation for his role in Harold Pinter’s Betrayal, Juliá moved temporarily to London, hiring a dialect coach to train him in British pronunciation. Juliá would subsequently use a British or Trans-Atlantic accent for most of his film work, including Presumed Innocent, The Addams Family films, and Street Fighter.

Acting in Hollywood
In 1982, Juliá played Calibanos in Mazursky's Tempest and Ray in the musical One from the Heart. In 1983, his first son with Poloway, Raúl Sigmund Juliá, was born. That year, he also starred in the public television film Overdrawn at the Memory Bank, which received a weak reception and was satirized on Mystery Science Theater 3000. After not appearing in a film for two years, Juliá played a political prisoner named Valentín in an adaptation of the Manuel Puig work Kiss of the Spider Woman.  Valentín’s cellmate is a flamboyant homosexual (William Hurt), jailed for immoral behavior in Brazil, who passes the time by describing scenes from his favorite romantic movie to Valentín; slowly, the two form a bond based on mutual understanding and respect. In view of the uniqueness of the script, Juliá agreed to begin filming before receiving his salary and traveled to South America, where he interviewed rebels and ex-prisoners to familiarize himself with their experiences and ideology. Upon its release, Kiss of the Spider Woman was a commercial and critical success. For his performance, Juliá received a nomination for the Golden Globe Award and won the National Board of Review of Motion Pictures award for best actor, along with co-lead actor William Hurt.

The following year, he appeared in his first Puerto Rican film, La Gran Fiesta, offering a monologue near the end of the film. In 1985, he starred as Major Sergius Saranoff in an adaptation of Arms and the Man. This was followed by the role of David Suárez in the romantic comedy Compromising Positions. In 1986, Juliá played a hairdresser named Joaquin Manero in The Morning After. Following his usual procedure of practical preparation for a role, he took cosmetology lessons and worked at a hair salon for some time.

In 1987, Juliá had the lead role in The Penitent. Later on that year, his second son with Poloway, Benjamín Rafael Juliá, was born. In 1988, Juliá played a corrupt official in Paul Mazursky's comedy, Moon over Parador, which received negative reviews from critics. The following year, he co-starred with Anthony Quinn in Onassis: The Richest Man in the World, a biographic film covering the life of Aristotle Onassis. In 1989, Juliá was cast as San Salvadoran Archbishop Óscar Romero in the biographical movie, Romero. During his life, Romero had been a staunch advocate of human rights, often publicly denouncing violations of these rights, which prompted his assassination during a mass. Juliá accepted the role based on its political nature, seeking to draw attention to the issues in that region of Central America. To prepare for the role, he read Romero's diary and autobiography as well as listening to or watching recordings of his messages and masses, which prompted him to rejoin the Catholic Church. He and Poloway, who is Jewish, decided not to raise their children in a particular religion, believing that they should make their own decisions after reaching adulthood. The government of El Salvador refused to allow distribution of the film because of its content, so the film received only clandestine circulation. Due to his activity between 1987 and 1989, Juliá was ranked first in the Variety article "List of Busiest Hollywood Actors". Juliá then starred in the 1989 film adaptation of The Threepenny Opera, recreating the role of Macheath for the movie, which was renamed Mack the Knife for its American release.

In 1990, he was cast to as a lawyer in Presumed Innocent, receiving solid reviews for his performance. Prior to the filming, Juliá spent time in courtrooms and studied the court system. Also in 1990, he appeared opposite Robert Redford in Havana, but chose to remain uncredited because the director, Sydney Pollack, refused to give him above-the-line credit. In 1991, when Joseph Papp died, Juliá commented that the director was directly responsible for finding him roles besides that of "stereotypical Latinos", such as the "Latin lover". Juliá was cast to play Gomez Addams in an adaptation of The Addams Family. He was attracted to the role because of the character's irreverent portrayal, noting that "even his depressions are wonderful". Since his earlier recollections of the role were of the Spanish-dubbed version of the first television series, he had to adapt the role directly from the original cartoons drawn by Charles Addams, receiving a nomination for a Saturn Award. It is interesting to note that Juliá appeared in 1982's The Escape Artist with Jackie Coogan, who portrayed Fester Addams in the 1964-1966 television series The Addams Family.

In 1992, Juliá played the title role in a revival of Man of La Mancha with Sheena Easton, a Broadway musical adaptation of the Miguel de Cervantes novel, Don Quixote. The play originated in 1965, with the main character played by Richard Kiley; one of his favorite actors, José Ferrer, had been considered for the title role at the time. Juliá performed this role eight times per week. Subsequently, he reprised his role as Gomez Addams in Addams Family Values. In 1994, Juliá played Chico Mendes in The Burning Season for HBO, for which he received critical acclaim. He familiarized himself with the role by analyzing interviews and footage from Mendes' Xapuri Rubber Tappers Union.

Despite his poor health, which began three years prior to his death, he completed The Burning Season and was eager to play M. Bison in Street Fighter, which was to be filmed in Australia in the autumn. Juliá felt that this film would allow him to spend more time with his children, who were fans of the video game franchise and helped him prepare for the role. He received his second Saturn Award nomination for his performance, which was considered the high point of the otherwise poorly received motion picture. This would be his final role in a major film, with his last work being a supporting role in the television drama Down Came a Blackbird, which was filmed in Toronto, Ontario during September and October 1994. His poor health was apparent in these last three films because of his substantial weight loss.

Illness and death
Unknown to the public, Juliá had suffered from stomach cancer for three years prior to his death and had undergone surgery for it. In early 1994, during the filming of The Burning Season in Mexico, he contracted food poisoning after consuming sushi. Juliá was airlifted to a hospital in Los Angeles to receive medical attention. After recovering, he returned to Mexico to finish the film, although he had lost some weight and was physically weakened by his condition. On October 16, 1994, Juliá and Poloway attended the Metropolitan Opera in New York; afterwards, Juliá began feeling intense abdominal pain and was taken by ambulance to North Shore University Hospital in Manhasset, Long Island. At first, he did not appear worried about his condition and was seen in his hospital bed reviewing the script for his upcoming role in Desperado, but his condition gradually worsened. On the night of October 20, 1994, Juliá suffered a stroke, fell into a coma, and was put on life support. Four days later, on October 24, 1994, Juliá died at the age of 54 from complications of the stroke, never having regained consciousness.

In accordance with Juliá's instructions, his body was transported to Puerto Rico. A state funeral was held in San Juan on October 27, 1994, with Juliá’s body being escorted to the building of the Institute of Puerto Rican Culture, where a funeral ceremony was held. The service was attended by thousands of Puerto Ricans, with native plena music being played in the background. The burial ceremony was also attended by thousands, with "La Borinqueña" being sung by Lucecita Benítez prior to the procession. After stopping at San Ignacio de Loyola Church, the procession advanced to Buxeda Cemetery, where politician and activist Rubén Berríos offered the final words. As Juliá's coffin was lowered, a load of carnations was dropped from a helicopter while the crowd shouted "¡Viva Puerto Rico Libre!" Juliá was a lifelong supporter of the Puerto Rican independence movement; on one occasion, he convinced his agent to allow him to do an advertising campaign on behalf of the Puerto Rico Tourism Company.

Subsequent memorial ceremonies were held at Joseph Papp Public Theater in New York and in Los Angeles, where several actors and personalities, including Rubén Blades and Edward James Olmos, expressed their grief. A mass in Miami and numerous private ceremonies were also held. The staff of Universal Pictures paid homage to him by dedicating Street Fighter to his memory, adding the phrase "For Raúl. Vaya con Dios." in the film's ending credits. Juliá had been set to reprise his role as M. Bison in the video game version of the Street Fighter film, having already met with the production staff. The New York Shakespeare Festival bought an obituary notice in Variety, where his birth and death dates were accompanied by a quote from Shakespeare. The Puerto Rican Traveling Theater established The Raúl Juliá Training Unit, giving free acting classes to young actors.

For his performance in The Burning Season, Juliá was posthumously awarded a Golden Globe Award, a Screen Actors Guild Award, a CableACE Award, and an Emmy Award. Although he did not make his screen debut before 1950, Juliá was a nominee for the American Film Institute's AFI's 100 Years...100 Stars. Actors such as Helen Hunt and Jimmy Smits have cited him as a source of inspiration. On November 21, 1994, Rudy Giuliani declared that date Raul Juliá Day. In 1996, he was inducted into the Theatre Hall of Fame on Broadway. The Puerto Rican Chamber of Commerce created the Raúl Juliá Scholarship Fund in 1997, intended to provide college education for teenagers.

Humanitarian work
During his lifetime, Juliá continued the charitable work done by his parents during his childhood, engaging in social and educational activities. His contributions were acknowledged with an invitation to join the New York Council for the Humanities. Much of Juliá's charity work was focused on at-risk youth, the Latin American community, and the arts. Concerned about rising levels of violence among teenagers, he sponsored scriptwriting programs in high schools and supported young actors. To promote other Latin American artists, Juliá actively lent his support to the Hispanic Organization of Latin Actors (HOLA) and co-founded Visiones Luminosas, an initiative to foster screenwriters. He continued to work in the NYSF, electing to donate his time.

In a similar fashion, Juliá cooperated with independent filmmakers in Puerto Rico by acting in their productions for free or receiving a reduced salary. This constant involvement with the Latin American community earned him a posthumous Hispanic Heritage Award. Juliá also promoted interracial acceptance and cooperation as a member of Racial Harmony and served as the chairman of the Joseph Papp Celebrity Coalition for Racial Harmony.

As part of his work for The Hunger Project, Juliá made monthly donations to a food bank. He also promoted the program on television and radio and served as the narrator of bilingual videos about the Hunger Project. Juliá somehow found time in his notoriously busy schedule to participate in multiple benefit galas on behalf of the organization as well. Due to this work, the project gave him their Global Citizen Award. His involvement was also recognized in "Ending Hunger: An Idea Whose Time Has Come". On March 24, 1992, Juliá received the Courage of Conscience Award. In 1994, the government of El Salvador recognized him for his human rights activism, selecting him to serve as overseer of their general elections in representation of Freedom House. During his visit to the country, he visited the tomb of Romero, subsequently describing his experience in a piece published in Freedom Review.

In recognition of his wide-ranging impact, the National Endowment for the Hispanic Arts offers the Raul Juliá Award for Excellence annually. In 2002, actress Sandra Bullock was presented with the award. She received it for her work as the executive producer of the George Lopez TV series, which offered work and exposition for Hispanic talent. In 2003, Daniel Rodríguez won the first Raúl Juliá Global Citizen Award from the New York-based Puerto Rico Family Institute, receiving the recognition for his charitable work.

Honors and legacy
 The Raúl Juliá Micro Society, a Public School 3, in the Tremont neighborhood in the New York City borough of the Bronx, was named in honor of Juliá.
 The actor's training unit of the Puerto Rican Traveling Theater was renamed the Raúl Juliá Training Unit.
 The National Hispanic Foundation for the Arts (NHFA) honors outstanding entertainment personalities annually with their Raúl Juliá Award for Excellence. The award, which recognizes individuals who have contributed to the growth and awareness of Latinos in the arts and media, is awarded annually to many Hispanic and non-Hispanic personalities. Past winners include Cristina Saralegui (2010) and Sandra Bullock (2002).
 In 2000, the Hispanic Organization of Latin Actors (HOLA) renamed its Founders Award the Raúl Juliá HOLA Founders Award.
 In 2019, he was the subject of a PBS American Masters profile, Raúl Juliá: The World's a Stage.

Work

Film

Television

Theatre

Other credits
 1963 Bye, Bye Birdie (Teatro Tapia)
 1963 The Fourposter (Teatro Tapia)
 1963 The Happy Time (Teatro Tapia)
 1963 Macbeth (Teatro Tapia)
 1963 Othello (Teatro Tapia)
 1964 Life Is a Dream (Astor Theatre) – New York debut
 1966 La Carreta (Greenwich Mews Theatre)
 1967 No Exit (Bouwerie Lane Theatre)
 1968 The Hide and Seek Odyssey of Madelain Gimple (Eugene O'Neill Theater Center)
 1969 Paradise Gardens (Fortune Theatre)
 1971 Pinkville (St. Clement's Church)
 1972 Hamlet (Delacorte Theatre)

Awards and nominations

See also
 Cinema of Puerto Rico
 List of Puerto Ricans

Notes

References

Bibliography

External links

 
 
 
 
PBS American Masters: Raul Julia

1940 births
1994 deaths
20th-century Puerto Rican male singers
20th-century Puerto Rican male actors
Best Miniseries or Television Movie Actor Golden Globe winners
Burials in Puerto Rico
Colegio San Ignacio de Loyola alumni
Fordham University alumni
Hispanic and Latino American male actors
Male actors from San Juan, Puerto Rico
Outstanding Performance by a Lead Actor in a Miniseries or Movie Primetime Emmy Award winners
Outstanding Performance by a Male Actor in a Miniseries or Television Movie Screen Actors Guild Award winners
Puerto Rican male film actors
Puerto Rican male stage actors
Puerto Rican male television actors
Puerto Rican Roman Catholics